Vladimir Krulj is a French and Serbian economist, fellow at the free-market think tank Institute of Economic Affairs in London.

He obtained an executive master from HEC Paris. Krulj also earned a PhD from the Faculty of Economics Finance and Administration at Singidunum University and completed post-doctorate research at the Louvain Catholic University.

Krulj served in advisory roles to the Government of Serbia. From 2016 to 2018 Krulj was President of the Board of Komercijalna Banka. Krulj is a macroeconomic analyst and a columnist of printed and electronic media in Serbia and abroad.

References

French economists
Serbian economists
Living people
Year of birth missing (living people)